USS Walter X. Young (DE-723) was a proposed United States Navy Rudderow-class destroyer escort that was never built.

The name Walter X. Young was approved for DE-723 on 7 February 1944. Plans called for her to be built by the Dravo Corporation at Pittsburgh, Pennsylvania.  However, before work on the ship began, the contract for her construction was cancelled on 12 March 1944 in order to free the Dravo shipyard for the building of landing craft.

The name Walter X. Young was reassigned to another Rudderow-class destroyer escort, USS Walter X. Young (DE-715), which was converted during construction into the fast transport USS Walter X. Young (APD-131).

References 

NavSource Naval History: Photographic History of The U.S. Navy: Destroyer Escorts, Frigates, Littoral Warfare Vessels

Rudderow-class destroyer escorts
Cancelled ships of the United States Navy
Ships built by Dravo Corporation